Elmer H. Behnke (February 3, 1929 – May 25, 2018) was an American basketball player.  Born in Rockford, Illinois, he played collegiately for Bradley University. He was selected by the Rochester Royals in the 4th round (35th pick overall) of the 1951 NBA draft.  He played for the Milwaukee Hawks (1951–52) in the NBA for 4 games.

References

External links

1929 births
2018 deaths
Basketball players from Illinois
Bradley Braves men's basketball players
Milwaukee Hawks players
Rochester Royals draft picks
Sportspeople from Rockford, Illinois
American men's basketball players
Centers (basketball)